Endora may refer to:

Fictional topics

Fictional people 
 Endora (Bewitched), the magical mother-in-law portrayed by Agnes Moorehead on the TV sitcom Bewitched
 Endora Lenox, the good witch character on the television soap opera Passions
 Empress Endora, a fictional character from the videogame Ogre Battle: The March of the Black Queen

Fictional places 
 Endora, a planet-sized matrioshka array in the Walter Jon Williams novel Implied Spaces 
 Endora, a fictional kingdom found in the Japanese multimedia franchise Endride
 Endora, Iowa, the rural setting for two novels by Peter Hedges, What's Eating Gilbert Grape and An Ocean in Iowa

Other fictional elements 
 The Endora, a fictional spaceship found in Gundam ZZ, see List of Mobile Suit Gundam ZZ characters
 Endora Corporation, a fictional company found in the 2010 videogame Alternativa

Other uses
 "Like Endora," alternative rock album by Australian songwriter, Adam Cole (2000)
 Endora Playfield, Cleveland, Ohio, USA; a public park in the Cleveland Public Parks District
 Endora (ship), several ships by the name
 Endora (wrecked 1855), a Canadian (British) steamship shipwrecked in 1855, see List of shipwrecks in August 1855
 Endora (wrecked 1867), a British ship shipwrecked in 1867, see List of shipwrecks in November 1867

See also

 Papilio endora (P. endora), a butterfly
 Endor (disambiguation)